is a rural district located in Gunma Prefecture, Japan. As of January 2015, the district had an estimated population of 36,952 and an area of 25.78 km2, with a population density of 1430 people per square kilometer.

Towns and villages
Tamamura
All of the city of Isesaki and part of the city of Maebashi were formerly part of the district.

History
Sawa District was created on April 1, 1896 by the merger of Sai District and Nawa District. At the time of its creation, it was organized into three towns (Isesaki, Sakai and Tamamura) and 13 villages.

1940, September 13 – Uehasu and Moro villages annexed by Isesaki, which was raised to city status
1955, January 10 – Isesaki annexed Misato village
1955, March 1 – Sakai annexed Uneme, Gōshi and Shima villages
1955, March 25 – Isesaki annexed Nawa, Toyouke and Miyagō villages
1955, April 20 – Tamamura annexed Shibane village
1957, August 1 - Sakai annexed the villages of Jōyō
1986, October 1 – Akabori village was raised to town status
2005, January 1 – Akabori, Sakai towns and Azuma village are annexed by Isesaki.

Districts in Gunma Prefecture